Dildo Key is a small island in the Florida Bay in the U.S. state of Florida, located in Everglades National Park. It is named for the Dildo Cactus (Acanthocereus tetragonus), a native species. Dildo Key has been noted for its unusual name.

References

Uninhabited islands of Monroe County, Florida
Everglades
Islands of Florida